euNetworks  is a European provider of bandwidth infrastructure services.

euNetworks own and operate 17 fibre based metropolitan networks across Europe connected with a high capacity intercity backbone covering 51 cities in 15 countries.

Their metro networks are in London, Manchester, Dublin, Amsterdam, Rotterdam, Utrecht, Paris, Frankfurt, Cologne, Düsseldorf, Stuttgart, Munich, Hamburg, Berlin, Vienna, Milan and Madrid. They also directly connect 14 cloud platforms with their network with access to additional platforms.

euNetworks is headquartered in London with offices across Europe.

euNetworks' Products

 Colocation
 Dark Fibre
 Metro Wavelengths
 Long Haul Wavelengths
 Carrier Ethernet
 Internet

References

Telecommunications companies of the United Kingdom